Artem is a common Ukrainian male given name. 

Many Russians named Artyom are known in English as Artem. (Artyom is spelled with the "ё" letter, giving a  ending sound; however, it is commonly romanized as "e".) Artem is also used as a given name in Armenian with the variant Ardem in Western Armenian

Artem may refer to:

 Artem Vinicius Soares Dias, Braszilian soccer player

Artem Anisimov, Russian ice hockey player
Artem Bobukh, Ukrainian association football player
Artem Borodulin, Russian figure skater
Artem Bulyansky, Russian ice hockey player
Artem Butenin, Ukrainian association football player
Artem Chigvintsev, Russian-American dancer
Artem Dolgopyat (born 1997), Israeli artistic gymnast
Artem Dzyuba, Russian professional footballer
Artem Fedetskiy, Ukrainian association football player
Artem Fedorchenko, Ukrainian association football player
Artem Gomelko, Belarusian association football player
Artem Grigoriev, Russian figure skater
Artem Khadjibekov, Russian sport shooter
Artem Kasyanov, Ukrainian association football player
Artem Knyazev, Uzbekistani pairs skater
Artem Kononuk, Russian sprint canoer
Artem Kontsevoy (disambiguation), multiple people
Artem Kopot, Russian ice hockey player
Artem Kravets, Ukrainian association football player
Artem Laguta, Russian speedway racer
Artemi Lakiza, Kazakhstani ice hockey player
Artem Levin, Russian Muay Thai kickboxer
Artem Lobov, Russian mixed martial artist
Artem Markelov, Russian racing driver
Artem Mikoyan, Soviet Armenian aircraft designer
Artem Milevskyi, Ukrainian association football player
Alfred Nakache, French swimmer known as Artem
Artem Ohandjanian, Austrian-Armenian historian
Artem Ovcharenko, Russian ballet dancer
Ardem Patapoutian, Armenian American molecular biologist, neuroscientist and Nobel laureate
Artem Pivovarov, Ukranian Singer
Artem Putivtsev, Ukrainian association football player
Artem Semenenko, Ukrainian association football player
Artem Ternavsky, Russian ice hockey player
Artem Teryan, Armenian sport wrestler
Artem Tetenko, Ukrainian association football player
Artem Tsoglin (born 1997), Israeli pair skater
Artem Vaulin, Ukrainian man believed to have operated the original KickassTorrents website
Artem Vodyakov, Russian speedway rider
Artem Voronin, Russian ice hockey player
Artem Yarchuk, Russian ice hockey player
Artem Yashkin, Ukrainian association football player
Artem Yusupov, Bukharian Doctor of Audiology
Artem Zabelin, Russian basketball player
Artem Zasyadvovk, Ukrainian association football player
Artem Zhmurko, Russian cross country skier

Ukrainian masculine given names